PHF is a three letter acronym meaning:

Paired Helical Filaments, a term for aggregations of protein in the brain, in conditions such as Alzheimer's disease
The Pakistan Hockey Federation, national governing body for field hockey
Patrick Henry Field, the IATA code for the Newport News/Williamsburg International Airport
Peak Hour Factor, a traffic flow characteristic
Perfect Hair Forever, an American animated television comedy 
Perfect Hair Forever (band), an alternative rock band from Auckland, New Zealand
Perfect hash function, a set of hash functions which generate no collisions.
Potentially Hazardous Food, a food safety classification
Potomac Horse Fever, an illness affecting horses caused by Neorickettsia risticii.
Premier Hockey Federation, a professional women's ice hockey league located in the United States & Canada.
Public Health Foundation
Putting Hartlepool First, a localist English political party based in Hartlepool.